Survey says may refer to:
"Survey says" (TV phrase), heard on the TV show Family Feud
Survey Says (song), by The Dismemberment Plan from their 1995 album !